PS Earl of Ulster was a paddle steamer passenger vessel operated by the London and North Western Railway and the Lancashire and Yorkshire Railway from 1878 to 1894.

History

She operated on services from Fleetwood to Belfast.

On 30 June 1883, she was involved in a collision off the Isle of Man with the schooner Susanna.

On 12 March 1889, she collided with the Holywood Lighthouse in Belfast Lough and destroyed it.

After being sold to A M Carlisle in 1894, Earl of Ulster passed into the ownership of J McCausland of Portaferry and was briefly put into service on Strangford Lough running excursion trips for one season before being broken up.

References

1878 ships
Passenger ships of the United Kingdom
Steamships
Ships built in Barrow-in-Furness
Ships of the London and North Western Railway
Ships of the Lancashire and Yorkshire Railway
Paddle steamers of the United Kingdom